Isolepis congrua, the slender club-sedge, is a species of flowering plant in the sedge family. A small, tufted annual plant growing to 20 cm tall, often seen in the Australian Outback.

References

congrua
Flora of New South Wales
Flora of the Northern Territory
Flora of Victoria (Australia)
Flora of South Australia
Flora of Western Australia
Plants described in 1908